Unai Elgezabal Udondo (born 25 April 1993) is a Spanish footballer who plays for Burgos CF. Mainly a central defender, he can also play as a defensive midfielder.

Club career
Born in Urduliz, Biscay, Basque Country, Elgezabal graduated from Danok Bat CF's youth setup. In 2012, he joined Athletic Bilbao and made his senior debut with the farm team in Tercera División, but was released in 2014.

In July 2014, Elgezabal joined SCD Durango also in the fourth tier. After being an undisputed starter, he moved to Segunda División B side Barakaldo CF on 1 July 2015.

In the 2016 winter transfer window, Elgezabal refused an offer from RCD Mallorca and remained at the Fabriles until the end of the campaign. On 20 June 2016, he signed for La Liga side SD Eibar, being loaned to AD Alcorcón in Segunda División on 18 August.

Elgezabal made his professional debut on 4 September 2016, starting in a 1–1 away draw against CD Numancia. After contributing with 21 appearances as his side avoided relegation, he moved to the latter club on 16 August 2017, on a one-year loan deal.

On 15 August 2018, Elgezabal renewed his contract until 2020 and returned to Alkor also in a one-year loan deal. The following 6 July, after returning from loan, he terminated his contract with the Armeros, and signed a permanent two-year deal with Alcorcón five days later.

On 10 September 2020, Elgezabal terminated his contract with Alcorcón, and signed for third division side Burgos CF fourteen days later.

Career statistics

Club

References

External links

1993 births
Living people
People from Mungialdea
Sportspeople from Biscay
Spanish footballers
Footballers from the Basque Country (autonomous community)
Association football defenders
Segunda División players
Segunda División B players
Tercera División players
Danok Bat CF players
CD Basconia footballers
Barakaldo CF footballers
SD Eibar footballers
AD Alcorcón footballers
CD Numancia players
Athletic Bilbao footballers
Burgos CF footballers